YVR–Airport is an elevated station on the Canada Line of Metro Vancouver's SkyTrain rapid transit system. The station is located at Vancouver International Airport's main terminal in Richmond, British Columbia, and is one of the outbound termini of the Canada Line, the other being Richmond–Brighouse.

The Vancouver International Airport Authority contributed up to $300 million toward the airport branch of the Canada Line, which includes YVR–Airport. Like Richmond–Brighouse station, YVR–Airport only has a single track.

Services
YVR–Airport station serves both the domestic and international terminals of Vancouver International Airport (YVR). Located on Sea Island, it provides the only direct, transfer-free public transit connection between Downtown Vancouver and the airport. During off hours, the station is served by the N10 bus route, which provides service to Downtown Vancouver and Richmond–Brighouse station.

Station information

Station layout

Entrances

YVR–Airport is served by two entrances. The Domestic Terminal entrance is accessible by an overhead walkway on the concourse level. The International Terminal entrance is accessible by a walkway on the parkade level. This entrance also provides street level access to Grant McConachie Way.

Airport surcharge
As with all stations on Sea Island—YVR–Airport, Sea Island Centre, and Templeton—a $5.00 surcharge, the "YVR AddFare", applies to fares paid with cash, with Compass Card stored value, or with DayPasses purchased at the station for eastbound trips originating from this station to Bridgeport station or beyond. Trips using a monthly pass are exempt, as are trips using DayPasses purchased and activated off Sea Island. Trips to YVR–Airport are not subject to the surcharge. Travel between YVR–Airport, Sea Island Centre, and Templeton stations is free.

References

External links
 

Airport railway stations in Canada
Buildings and structures in Richmond, British Columbia
Railway stations in Canada opened in 2009
2009 establishments in British Columbia
Canada Line stations
Vancouver International Airport